Giovanni Padovani (or Paduani) (b. c. 1512) was an Italian mathematician and astronomer.  He lived in Verona and was a student of Pietro Pitati.  He published a number of esteemed treatises on various astronomical and mathematical subjects, the most well-known of which was a treatise on the sundial called Opus de compositione et usu multiformium horologiorum solarium, pro diversis mundi regionibus, idq(ue) ubique locorum tam in superficie plana horizontali quam murali quoruscumqu(ue) exposita sit, pertractans (Venice, 1570).  An expanded and re-written version came out in 1582.

This manual includes instructions for the manufacture and laying out of mural (vertical) and horizontal sundials; contains extensive tables of declinations for various latitudes with both occidental and oriental examples; and provides instructions for the calculation of latitudes.  This last section includes a description of a sundial calibrated for the measurement of unequal hours, such as those used in the ecclesiastic calendar, which foresaw twelve hours of light and twelve of dark, which was subject to severe seasonal variations.

Sources
Papyrus Rare Books 
Roger Gaskell Rare Books 
Krown & Spellman Booksellers info

16th-century Italian astronomers
16th-century Italian mathematicians
1512 births
Year of death missing